BWHS may refer to:

 Big Walnut High School, a high school in Sunbury, Ohio
 Bishop Watterson High School, a high school in Columbus, Ohio
 Black Women's Health Study
 Briar Woods High School, a high school in Ashburn, Virginia
 Bellevue West High School, a high school in Bellevue Nebraska